Thrypsigenes furvescens is a moth in the family Gelechiidae. It was described by Edward Meyrick in 1914. It is found in Guyana.

The wingspan is about 13 mm. The forewings are fuscous with a whitish-ochreous stripe occupying the costal third from the base to four-fifths. The hindwings are rather dark fuscous.

References

Gelechiinae
Moths described in 1914